Gunnar Breivik (born 8 April 1943) is a Norwegian sociologist.

He was born in Oslo. Specializing in the sociology of sports, he was hired as an associate professor at the Norwegian School of Sport Sciences in 1975. He was promoted to professor in 1985, and was the rector there since 1999. Sigmund Loland took over in 2005.

References

1943 births
Living people
Norwegian sociologists
Academic staff of the Norwegian School of Sport Sciences
Rectors of universities and colleges in Norway
Writers from Oslo